This is a list of lighthouses in Chile from the Strait of Magellan to Paso Picton. It includes a number of Argentine lighthouses that may serve as navigational aids in Chilean waters around Ushuaia and Gable Island.

For Evangelistas Lighthouse, see List of lighthouses in Chile: Messier Channel to Smyth Channel.

Strait of Magellan (74°-72°W)

Jerónimo Channel

Otway Sound

Brecknock Channel

Gabriel Channel

Whiteside Channel

Strait of Magellan (71°-68°W)

Bahía Desolada

Ballenero Channel

Thomson Channel

Cook Bay

Beagle Channel

Ushuaia Bay (A.)

Gable Island (A.)

Paso Picton

See also
List of fjords, channels, sounds and straits of Chile
List of islands of Chile

References
  List of Lights, Radio Aids and Fog Signals: The West Coast of North and South America... National Geospatial-Intelligence Agency. 2013. pp. 20–60.

NGA2328-NGA2718
NGA2328-NGA2718
Lighthouses NGA2328-NGA2718